Jorge Hernández (November 17, 1954 – December 12, 2019) born in Havana was a boxer from Cuba, who represented his native country at the 1976 Summer Olympics in Montreal, Canada. There he won the gold medal in the light flyweight division (– 48 kg) by defeating North Korea's Li Byong-Uk in the final. Four years later, when Moscow hosted the Games, he was eliminated in the second round in the flyweight division (– 51 kg).

Hernández won the world title at the inaugural 1974 World Championships in Havana, Cuba, followed by the silver medal four years later, when Belgrade hosted the World Championships. He also captured the gold at the 1975 Pan American Games.

Results

1976 Olympic Games
 Round of 32 Defeated Beyhan Fuchedzhiev (Bulgaria) RSC 3
 Round of 16: Defeated Zoffa Yarawi (Papua New Guinea) KO 3
 Quarterfinal: Defeated Chan-Hee Park (South Korea) by decision, 3–2
 Semifinal: Defeated Orlando Maldonado (Puerto Rico) by decision, 5–0
 Final: Defeated Li Byong-Uk (North Korea) 4–1 (won gold medal)

1979 Pan American Games
Defeated Manuel Mariona (El Salvador) points
Lost to Jerome Coffee (United States) points

1980 Olympic Games
1st round bye
Lost to Viktor Miroshnichenko (Soviet Union) by decision, 1–4

References
 databaseOlympics
 

1954 births
2019 deaths
Boxers from Havana
Flyweight boxers
Boxers at the 1976 Summer Olympics
Boxers at the 1980 Summer Olympics
Olympic boxers of Cuba
Olympic gold medalists for Cuba
Olympic medalists in boxing
Medalists at the 1976 Summer Olympics
Cuban male boxers
Cuban people of African descent
Boxers at the 1975 Pan American Games
Boxers at the 1979 Pan American Games
Pan American Games gold medalists for Cuba
AIBA World Boxing Championships medalists
Pan American Games medalists in boxing
Medalists at the 1975 Pan American Games
20th-century Cuban people